Soundtrack to a Headrush is the first studio album by the band Emanuel. It was released on March 1, 2005 by Vagrant Records. The album had two singles, "The Willing" and "Make Tonight". Both videos were in active rotation on many music video channels.

Reception
Punk News editor Brian Shulz compared the sound of the album to "like a cross between a poor man's Bronx and a rich man's Senses Fail" and stating the album was "Plagued by mediocrity via a mildly awkward hybrid of the abovegiven sounds.. [the album is] well-produced and musically competent but sparse in staying power." Hein Terweduwe of Punk News was more positive in his review, stating the album used "good elements of different genres to meld it into something that is quite new and different like anything I've listened to". Allmusic reviewer Stewart Mason described the album as generic, calling it "straight by-the-numbers emo-punk-pop" and criticizing it for its familiarity.

Track listing

Personnel
 Mat Barber – lead guitar, backing vocals
 Anthony Brock – drums
 Matt Breen – vocals, rhythm guitar
 Bryan Whiteman – bass guitar

References

Emanuel (band) albums
2005 debut albums
Vagrant Records albums
Albums produced by Machine (producer)